Fadhel Jaziri (born 1948) is a Tunisian actor and film director.

Early life and career 
Fadhel Jaziri was born in the medina of the Tunisian capital in 1948 to an upper-middle-class family who used to run a fez-making business. In addition to other businesses related to hospitality industry, Jaziri's father had a bookshop in the neighborhood of Bab Souika. Young Fadhel thus had the opportunity to meet and be influenced by the men of arts, theatre and politics that his father often had the pleasure of receiving. 
Fadhel Jaziri attended the modern Sadiki College where he had a freshman's experience with a student theatrical group which also included the Tunisian actor Raouf Ben Amor. During the 1968 events, Jaziri was very active and participated in the demonstrations taking place in Tunisian campuses where he even delivered speeches. His young man's rage against repression and political corruption led to his dismissal from the Faculty of Arts before finishing his diploma in philosophy. Fortunately for him, he soon received a scholarship to study in the English capital along with a number of other promising young Tunisians.

Jaziri's very first experience on stage was at the Ibn Khaldoun Palace of Culture in Tunis with the outstanding Tunisian actor Ali Ben Ayed when he had to play a walk-on part in Murad III. However, upon his return from London in 1972, Jaziri cofounded the theatrical group of Gafsa known in French as “Théâtre du Sud”. The team included Tunisia's most recognized theatre stars such as Fadhel Jaibi, Raja Farhat, Jalila Baccar and Mohamed Driss. In Tunis, Jaziri and Jaibi later launched the “Nouveau Théâtre de Tunis” and produced a number of plays that would become major classics of Tunisian drama.

In 2007, Fadhel Jaziri directs Thalatun (meaning 30 in Arabic), a movie received with much praise and which depicts Tunisian life in the 1930s. The main heroes of Jaziri's opus are three immanent figures that have a very special place in Tunisian history and culture. They are the social reformer Tahar Haddad, the trade-unionist Mohamed Ali El Hammi and the poet Abu Al Kacem Chebbi.
However, what has really made Fadhel Jaziri's fame in Tunisia and in the world was mainly his direction of the major musical shows known in Arabic as Nouba and Hadhra. These two works are of tremendous importance to the Tunisian audience as they represent the finest compilations of two basic genres of Tunisian folk music. Jaziri and his partners in the projects have helped immortalize sounds and voices that echo sagas of Tunisia's Berber, Arabic and Islamic roots. 
Nouba compiles old Tunisian folk songs and compositions that are marked by the prominent Berber bagpipe sound. The lyrics often deal with subjects related to love, celebration, nature, and old traditions, which is the case with “Between Rivers” by the late folk singer Ismail Hattab.  Hadhra is rather a compilation of mystic music from Tunisian Sufi Tariqas. Most of the songs celebrate and praise ancient Sufi saints and sages in addition to the praise for Allah and Prophet Muhammad. Both shows feature hundreds of folk singers and instrumentalists, which greatly contributes to the aura of originality and grandeur.

References

20th-century Tunisian male actors
Tunisian film directors
1948 births
Living people
Tunisian male stage actors
People from Tunis